Tighanab Bala (also Romanized as Tīghanab Bālā) is a village in Doreh Rural District, in the Central District of Sarbisheh County, South Khorasan Province, Iran. At the 2006 census, its population was 34, in 7 families.

References 

Populated places in Sarbisheh County